Chipping Norton Lake is a  artificial lake and regional park located in the Sydney suburb of , New South Wales, Australia. It is a part of the Georges River system. Chipping Norton Lake is managed by Liverpool City Council. The lake is an important recreational area for Liverpool, City of Canterbury-Bankstown and Fairfield City Council.

History
The Chipping Norton Lake area was inhabited by the Tharawal and Darug people before European settlement. The land where the lake is now situated, on the right bank of the Georges River, was granted to Thomas Rowley and George Johnston, with much of the land upstream given to Thomas Moore, an early settler and carpenter for the colony, who established farmland around the river. In the 1950s, sand mining on the point bar caused irreversible environmental destruction, and the area remained lifeless thereafter. In the late 1970s it was decided to flood the mine, leaving a large lake. Vegetation was planted around the lake to make a wildlife reserve.

Natural environment
There are over fifty different kinds of birds around the lake including pelicans, purple swamphens, egrets, maned ducks, pacific black ducks, sacred ibis, and pardalote; making birdwatching quite popular. The surrounding forests are filled with sedgelands, reeds and mangroves and the other native trees include the swamp oak, forest red gum, blue box, grey box, bangalay and rough barked apple. The alluvial woodland vegetation is another striking feature of the lake as it is an endangered ecological community.

The City of Liverpool, City of Canterbury-Bankstown and the City of Fairfield work together to manage the wildlife refuge and recreation areas of Chipping Norton Lake. There are four islands within the lake that serve as wildlife refuges for native birds and visitor access is prohibited. Bull sharks have been sighted in the lake.

Recreation

Chipping Norton Lake has a regional park located on Homestead Avenue, providing cycleways, barbecue facilities, picnic areas, playground equipment, boat ramps, sporting fields and the Georges River Environment Education Centre. There is also a beach in the lake called  Grand Flaneur Beach at Homestead Park. Although swimming is permitted at the beach, it is not recommended because of poor water quality. The Chipping Norton Lake also have a number of walkways.

Watercraft are permitted on Chipping Norton Lake. however, a strict speed limit of eight knots applies. The Lake also features a community hall that can be hired by residents or community groups for birthday parties, christenings, barmitzvahs, weddings or any other type of function. The hall can accommodate up to 100 people and has an upstairs balcony with views across the lake and surrounding parkland.

Parks
The lake is surrounded by a number of parks, recreational areas and/or reserves:

East side:
Henry Lawson Reserve
Flinders Slopes
Lake Gillawarna
Rowley Park
Garrison Point Reserve
Liverpool Golf Club
Georges River Golf Course

West side:
Irelands Bridge Reserve
South Park
Angle Park
Homestead Park
Black Muscat Park
Heron Park
Riverside Park

See also

 Bents Basin
 Geography of Sydney
 Lake Parramatta
 List of parks in Sydney
 Prospect Nature Reserve

References

External links

Lakes of New South Wales
Geography of Sydney
Parks in New South Wales
Parks in Sydney
Nature reserves in New South Wales
Georges River